Admiral Russell may refer to:

Edward Russell, 1st Earl of Orford (1653–1727), British Royal Navy admiral
Gerald Walter Russell (1850–1928), British Royal Navy admiral
Guy Russell (1898–1977), British Royal Navy admiral
James Sargent Russell (1903–1996), U.S. Navy admiral
John Henry Russell (1827–1897), U.S. Navy rear admiral
John Russell, 1st Earl of Bedford (c. 1485–1555), English Lord High Admiral
Lord Edward Russell (1805–1887), British Royal Navy admiral
Thomas Macnamara Russell (died 1824), British Royal Navy admiral